The 1997 All Japan Grand Touring Car Championship was the fifth season of Japan Automobile Federation GT premiere racing. It was marked as well as the fifteenth season of a JAF-sanctioned sports car racing championship dating back to the All Japan Sports Prototype Championship. The GT500 class champion was the #36 Castrol TOM'S Toyota Supra driven by Michael Krumm and Pedro de la Rosa and the GT300 class champion was the #19 Bandoh Racing Nissan Silvia driven by Hideo Fukuyama and Manabu Orido.

The GT500 Drivers' Championship was decided on a tiebreaker for the first and, as of the conclusion of the 2019 season, the only time in JGTC/Super GT history. The duo of De la Rosa and Krumm, and Toyota Team SARD driver Masami Kageyama each scored 67 points, with two victories, and one second place finish. But a third-place finish for De la Rosa and Krumm broke the tie, giving them the championship for the Toyota Castrol Team. With this, De la Rosa became the first driver to win both the GT500 Drivers' Championship, and the Japanese Top Formula Championship in Formula Nippon (now Super Formula), in the same calendar year.

Schedule

Season results

Point ranking

GT500 class

Drivers

GT300 Class (Top 5)

Drivers

External links
 Super GT/JGTC official race archive 
 1997 season results 

Super GT seasons
JGTC